The Sato (Uzbek: Сато) is a bowed tanbur, or long-necked lute, played by performers of Central Asian classical and folk music, mainly in Uzbekistan. It has five strings. When plucked, the top string is pressed to the neck to produce a melody; the other four strings are drone strings. Frets on the neck are made of tied string. The soundboard has holes drilled in it for sound holes. It is made from mulberry wood.

Famous Uzbek musician Turgun Alimatov is solely responsible for reviving the art of playing the Sato, as it had completely disappeared for a number of centuries before he took it up in 1957. Thus he has been considered as the founder of the Sato and its playing style and technique.  Professor Abduvali Abdurashidov is the foremost teacher of Sato and composer of the art of Shash Maqom (also called Shashmaqam) in Tajikistan.

References

 

Tajik musical instruments
Uzbekistani musical instruments